List of representatives and senators of the Arizona Legislature by legislative districts.

For a current list see List of representatives and senators of Arizona Legislature by districts (2023–2033)

Arizona – by legislature

Arizona – key senators

General election for U.S. Senate Arizona 2022 
	Candidate

Mark Kelly (D)

Blake Masters (R)

Marc Victor (L)

Arizona – by district 

† Member was appointed.

Arizona – 1st district – Prescott – Coconino County

Arizona – 2nd district – Flagstaff – Navajo County &  Apache County

Arizona – 3rd district – Mohave County – La Paz County N.

Arizona – 4th district – Yavapai County South – Maricopa County North

Arizona – 5th district – Gila County – Snowflake

Arizona – 6th district – Phoenix North – Cave Creek

Arizona – 7th district – Phoenix North-North-East – Carefree

Arizona – 8th district – Phoenix North-East – Scottsdale

Arizona – 9th district – Phoenix North-West – Sun City – Peoria

Arizona – 10th district – Phoenix North Central – Glendale

Arizona – 11th district – Phoenix East – Paradise Valley

Arizona – 12th district – Phoenix West – Litchfield Park

Arizona – 13th district – Phoenix South-West – Tolleson 

Photos : Miranda

Arizona – 14th district – Phoenix South Central

Arizona – 15th district – Phoenix South-East Central

Arizona – 16th district – Phoenix South – Guadalupe

Arizona – 17th district – Phoenix South-East – Tempe

Arizona – 18th district – Mesa West (South-East outside Phoenix)

Arizona – 19th district – Mesa East (South-East outside Phoenix)

Arizona – 20th district – Phoenix South – Chandler West

Arizona – 21st district – Chandler – Queen Creek (South-East Phoenix)

Arizona – 22nd district – Gilbert – Mesa South – Gold Camp

Arizona – 23rd district – Pinal County

Arizona – 24th district – Yuma County – La Paz County South

Arizona – 25th district – Pima County West – Cochise County

Arizona – 26th district – Oro Valley – Catalina (Tucson North)

Arizona – 27th district – Tucson West – Three Points

Arizona – 28th district – Tucson North

Arizona – 29th district – Tucson

Arizona – 30th district – Green Valley ( Tucson Sth et East) 

 
State Legislature